Burn the Witch is the first Limited edition EP by Stone Gods. It was released on February 25, 2008. According to the official Stone Gods website, the EP sold out within one day.

The first two tracks also appear on the full-length LP, Silver Spoons & Broken Bones.

Track listing
"Burn the Witch" - (Hawkins/Edwards/MacFarlaine/Graham) - 4:46
"You Brought a Knife to a Gunfight" - (Hawkins/Edwards) - 3:08
"Breakdown" - (Hawkins) - 3:24
"Heartburn" - (Hawkins) - 3:16

Personnel 

Richie Edwards – lead and backing vocals, rhythm guitar
Dan Hawkins – lead guitar
Toby MacFarlaine – bass guitar
Ed Graham – drums

References

Stone Gods albums
2008 EPs